Oblique (2008) is a film by the Norwegian artist Knut Åsdam  (1968).

Synopsis
The 13 minute film Oblique (2008) is an articulation of identity in transition. The entire film was shot on a train moving through a continuous mass built from cities and their adjoining regions. The characters are traveling in the suspended generic space of the train through regions composite of old and new economies and old and new social realities: Newly built outer areæ around the cities, construction sites, institutional and office buildings, transitory places, between growth and collapse, marked by quasi-contradictory processes of economic progress and development of slums. On the train coach itself, a targeted but sometimes absurd narrative plays itself out as a linguistic reaction to the time and place.

Urban environments, and their heterotopic sites, are locations for Knut Åsdam's investigations into social design, patterns of behavior and modes of subjectivity, with a particular focus on spatial identity's disorder and pathologies. Åsdam perceives a city as a machine of desire, its geography as a system of desire and its architecture as a generator of desiring practices. Usage and perception of public urban spaces, their structures of political power and authority occupy a central place in the artist's studies of identities.

Oblique premiered for Manifesta7 in July 2008.

Written and directed by: Knut Åsdam
Produced by: Manifesta7, FRAC Bourgogne, Galician Contemporary Art Center (CGAC)   with the support from Office for Contemporary Art  Oslo, Galleri SE  Bergen, Galería Joan Prats  Barcelona  and the Cultural Council of Norway

Exhibition/Screening history

2008:
Manifesta 7 July 19 – November 2, Rovereto, Italy As part of the hybrid architectural installation Oblique, 2008
Involved, Shanghart Gallery, October 31 – December 15  Shanghai, China
Comme au cinema: The cinematic as Method and metaphor, Fotogalleriet, November 6 - December 7 Oslo, Norway
Nouvelle Fiction, Les Rencontres, Centre Pompidou December 5, Paris, France
2009
Rencontres Internationales Paris/Berlin/Madrid XVIII, April 21  Madrid, Spain
the long gaze the short gaze, Galeria Joan Prats, May 5 – June 15  Barcelona, Spain
Summertime; or, Close-ups on Places We’ve (Never) Been - San Francisco Art Institute, CA June 27 -  September 12, San Francisco, CA

External links
  Official Knut Åsdam's webpage
  Manifesta7
  Shanghart Gallery
  Nouvelle Fiction, Les Rencontres
  Galeria Joan Prats
  Summertime; or, Close-ups on Places We’ve (Never) Been

Norwegian short films
2008 films